Bucranium is a genus of spiders in the family Thomisidae.

Species
, the World Spider Catalog accepted the following extant species:
Bucranium affine (O. Pickard-Cambridge, 1896) – Mexico
Bucranium pulchrum (Bryant, 1940) – Cuba
Bucranium spinigerum O. Pickard-Cambridge, 1891 – Guatemala
Bucranium taurifrons O. Pickard-Cambridge, 1881 (type species) – Venezuela, Guyana, Peru, Brazil, Paraguay

References

Thomisidae
Araneomorphae genera